József Marton (19 March 1907 – 26 December 1974) was a Hungarian middle-distance runner. He competed in the men's 1500 metres at the 1928 Summer Olympics.

References

1907 births
1974 deaths
Athletes (track and field) at the 1928 Summer Olympics
Hungarian male middle-distance runners
Olympic athletes of Hungary
Place of birth missing
20th-century Hungarian people